Changhe Aircraft Industries Corporation (CAIC) is a Chinese helicopter manufacturer and supplier to the Chinese military. It is a member of the Aviation Industry Corporation of China (AVIC). The company is based in the city of Jingdezhen in Jiangxi province. Changhe employs 4300 employees in two production facilities with 1.29 million sq. metres and 0.22 million sq. metres of construction area. It has a joint venture with Agusta Helicopter (Jiangxi Changhe-Agusta Helicopter Co., Ltd) and relationship with Sikorsky Aircraft Corporation. Its subsidiary, Changhe Machinery Factory, is a major automobile company in China.

History

 
The company was established in 1969 as a state enterprise and now as a contractor to the People's Liberation Army.

Products

Helicopters

 CAIC WZ-10 - attack helicopter currently in production; it is built to replace Wuzhuang Zhisheng WZ-9 
 Changhe Z-8 - naval and Z-8A army heavy transport helicopter; Chinese variant of SA321Ja Super Frelon
 Changhe CA109 - utility helicopter; Chinese version of A109
 Changhe Z-11 - light military utility helicopter
Changhe Z-18- a replacement for the Z-8 Super Frelon

Parts

 Tail rotor pylon for the Sikorsky S-92
 Fuselage for the Sikorsky S-76

See also
 Aviation Industry Corporation of China (AVIC)
 ACAC consortium
 Chengdu Aircraft Industry Group
 Guizhou Aircraft Industry Co.
 Harbin Aircraft Manufacturing Corporation
 Hongdu Aviation Industry Corporation
 Shaanxi Aircraft Company
 Shanghai Aviation Industrial Company
 Shenyang Aircraft Corporation
 Xi'an Aircraft Industrial Corporation

References

Further reading

External links

  
  

Helicopter manufacturers of China
Defence companies of the People's Republic of China
Manufacturing companies established in 1969
Companies based in Jiangxi